The Forward Taguig Patriots are a baseball team competing in Baseball Philippines, Philippines premier competition.

External links
 Baseball Philippines Official Website 

Baseball Philippines
Baseball teams in the Philippines
Sports teams in Metro Manila